

Walter Hörnlein (2 January 1893 – 14 September 1961) was a German general in the Wehrmacht during World War II, who commanded the Großdeutschland Division. He was a recipient of the Knight's Cross of the Iron Cross with Oak Leaves.

Awards and decorations
 Iron Cross (1914) 2nd Class (4 October 1914)
  Iron Cross (1939) 2nd Class (September 1939) & 1st Class (September 1939)
 German Cross in Gold (14 February 1943)
 Knight's Cross of the Iron Cross with Oak Leaves
 Knight's Cross on 30 July 1941 as Oberst and commander of Infanterie-Regiment 80
 213th Oak Leaves on 15 March 1943 as Generalleutnant and commander of Infanterie-Division (motorized) "Großdeutschland"

References

Bibliography

 
 

1893 births
1961 deaths
People from Ludwigslust-Parchim
People from the Grand Duchy of Mecklenburg-Schwerin
Generals of Infantry (Wehrmacht)
German Army personnel of World War I
Recipients of the clasp to the Iron Cross, 2nd class
Recipients of the Gold German Cross
Recipients of the Knight's Cross of the Iron Cross with Oak Leaves
German prisoners of war in World War II held by the United States
World War I prisoners of war held by France
Reichswehr personnel
German prisoners of war in World War I
Military personnel from Mecklenburg-Western Pomerania